1994 saw many sequels and prequels in video games, such as Super Metroid, Donkey Kong Country, Final Fantasy VI, Sonic 3 & Knuckles, Super Street Fighter II Turbo and Virtua Fighter 2 and Doom II, along with new titles such as Daytona USA, Ace Driver, Alpine Racer and Tekken.

The year's  video game console was the Game Boy, while the Sega Mega Drive/Genesis remained the  home console. The year's highest-grossing arcade video games were Super Street Fighter II X (Super Street Fighter II Turbo) and Virtua Fighter in Japan, and Daytona USA and Mortal Kombat II in the United States, while the year's best-selling home video game worldwide was Donkey Kong Country.

Events
Nintendo proclaims "1994: The Year of the Cartridge".
Nintendo Australia Pty. Ltd, the Australian subsidiary of Nintendo Co., Ltd is established and opened by Hiroshi Yamauchi and effectively ends Mattel Australia's distribution of Nintendo's products throughout Australia.
"Project Reality" is renamed the Nintendo Ultra 64. The console's design is revealed to the public for the first time in spring 1994.
The second of two congressional hearings on video games takes place on March 5. Topics for discussion include the depiction of violence and sexual content in video games, their influence on children, and the prospect of governmental regulation of video game content. 
April – The Interactive Digital Software Association (IDSA) is founded in response to the hearings (name changed to the Entertainment Software Association in 2003); the IDSA founds the Entertainment Software Rating Board (ESRB) in order to self-regulate content in video games in the mold of the Motion Picture Association of America film rating system.
April 28 – Sega and MGM make a venture to create video games, movies, and television programs.
June 24 – The Computer Game Developers Association is formed by Ernest W. Adams.
November – Game Zero magazine drops their print format and becomes the first video game news magazine on the web.
November 10 – William Higinbotham, creator of Tennis for Two (1958), dies at 84.

Hardware releases
Aiwa releases the Aiwa Mega-CD multimedia home console in Japan only.
Bandai releases the Playdia multimedia home console.
NEC releases the PC-FX multimedia home console.
Sega:
introduces the North American cable TV Sega Channel in cooperation with Time Warner (AOL Time Warner); the subscription service provides Sega Genesis games via cable box to customers
releases the Sega 32X add-on for the Sega Mega Drive/Genesis in Europe (November 14), North America (November 21) and Japan (December 3)
releases the Sega Nomad handheld console in North America, a portable Sega Genesis.
releases the Sega Saturn home console in Japan on November 22
SNK releases the Neo Geo CD home console.

Sony releases the PlayStation home console in Japan on December 3.
Nintendo releases the Super Game Boy adapter for the Super NES home console.
Atari Corporation discontinues the Lynx handheld system.

Top-rated games

Game of the Year awards
The following titles won Game of the Year awards for 1994.

Famitsu Platinum Hall of Fame
The following video game releases in 1994 entered Famitsu magazine's "Platinum Hall of Fame" for receiving Famitsu scores of at least 35 out of 40.

Financial performance

Highest-grossing arcade games
The best-selling arcade printed circuit board (PCB) worldwide in 1994 was SNK's Neo Geo MVS system.

Japan
The following titles were the top ten highest-grossing arcade games of 1994 in Japan.

United Kingdom
In the United Kingdom, the following titles were the highest-grossing games of each month in 1994.

Virtua Fighter by Sega AM2 was also one of the UK's most popular coin-ops of the year.

United States 
In the United States, the following titles were the highest-grossing arcade video games of 1994.

Best-selling video game consoles

Best-selling home video games
The following titles were the top ten best-selling home video games (console games or computer games) worldwide in 1994.

Japan 
In Japan, the following titles were the top ten best-selling home video games of 1994.

United States
In the United States, the following titles were the top ten best-selling home video games of 1994.

United Kingdom
HMV, a British entertainment retailer, released a monthly list of the chain's highest-selling home video game titles. The following titles topped the monthly all-formats charts, as reported by Computer and Video Games.

Notable releases

Business
New companies: Neversoft
Defunct: Commodore, Tradewest
September 14 – Video gaming magazine Nintendomagasinet is cancelled after four years. Number 9 of 1994 would have been released on this day, but instead the magazine joins Super Power.
Apogee establishes the 3D Realms Entertainment division.
Blizzard Entertainment is renamed from Silicon & Synapse.
SSI sold to Mindscape
Alpex Computer Corp. v. Nintendo lawsuit: Alpex sues Nintendo over patent infringements related to the NES. Nintendo loses the case. (In 1996 this ruling was reversed by an appeals court, which determined that no patents had been infringed upon.)
Nintendo of America, Inc. v. Dragon Pacific Intern

See also
1994 in games

Notes

References

 
Video games by year